Agnes of Brandenburg (c. 1257 – 29 September 1304) was a Danish Queen consort by marriage to King Eric V of Denmark. As a widow, she served as the regent of Denmark for her son, King Eric VI, during his minority from 1286 until 1293.

Life
She was born to John I, Margrave of Brandenburg (d. 1266) and Brigitte of Saxony, the daughter of Albert I, Duke of Saxony. 

She married King Eric V of Denmark at Schleswig on 11 November 1273. The marriage was probably agreed upon during King Eric's captivity in Brandenburg by Agnes' father from 1261 to 1264. Tradition claims that the King of Denmark was released from captivity on his promise to marry Agnes without a dowry. Denmark and Brandenburg, however, had a long tradition of dynastic marriages between them.

Regency
In 1286, she became a Queen dowager and the Regent of Denmark during the minority of her son. The details of her regency are not known more closely, and it is hard to determine which of the decisions were made by her, and which was made by the council. Peder Nielsen Hoseøl was also very influential in the regency, and she is likely to have received support from her family. In 1290, she financed a granted lime painting in St. Bendt's Church in Ringsted, which depicts her in a dominating way. Her son was declared of legal majority in 1293, thus ending her formal regency.

Later life
Married in 1293 to count Gerhard II of Holstein-Plön (d. 1312) with whom she had the son John III, Count of Holstein-Plön. She often visited Denmark also after her second marriage, and it continued to be a second home. She died on 29 September 1304, and was buried in Denmark.

Gallery

References
 Alf Henrikson: Dansk historia (Danish history) (1989) (Swedish)
 Sven Rosborn (In Swedish): När hände vad i Nordens historia ('When did what happen in the history of the Nordic countries') (1997)
  Dansk Kvindebiografisk Leksikon (In Danish)

1257 births
1304 deaths
13th-century women rulers
13th-century births
Danish royal consorts
Regents of Denmark
House of Schauenburg
House of Ascania
Remarried royal consorts
Burials at St. Bendt's Church, Ringsted
14th-century Danish people
14th-century Danish women
13th-century Danish people
13th-century Danish women
Queen mothers
Daughters of monarchs